The Kranji Mile is a thoroughbred horse race held annually in May at Singapore Turf Club. The race was first introduced in 2000. Contested on turf over a left-handed course, the domestic Group 1 race (also an International Group 3 race recognised in The Blue Book by the International Federation of Horseracing) is run over a distance 1,600 metres (8 furlongs) and is open to horses age three and older. In 2018, it was revamped as an invitational race but since 2020, has been open to local runners only due to races being conducted behind closed doors.

Records
Speed  record:
 1:33.25 – Lim’s Lightning (2022)

Most wins:
 2 - Better Than Ever (2010, 2011)
 2 - Pacific Prince (2000, 2002)
 2 - Southern Legend (2018, 2019)

Most wins by an owner:
 2 - Jupiter Stable (2010, 2011)
 2 - Prince Stable (2000, 2002)
 2 - Kings Stable (2004, 2006)
 2 - Boniface Ho (2018, 2019)
 2 - Lim’s Stable (2008, 2022)

Most wins by a jockey:
 2 - Saimee Jumaat (2010, 2011)
 2 - John Powell (2005, 2009)
 2 - Danny Beasley (2013, 2014)
 2 - Michael Rodd (2015, 2016)
 2 - Zac Purton (2018, 2019)

Most wins by a trainer:
 5 - Laurie Laxon (2008, 2009, 2010, 2011, 2015)

Winners

References
 The Kranji Mile at the Singapore Turf Club

Graded stakes races in Singapore
Open mile category horse races
Recurring events established in 2000
Sport in Singapore